Genevieve may refer to:
 Genevieve, a saint in Roman Catholic and Eastern Orthodox traditions, patron saint of Paris, France
 Genevieve (musician)  (b. 1987), an American indie pop singer
 Genevieve (actress) (1920-2004), a French-born American comedian, singer, and actress
 Genevieve of Brabant, a heroine of medieval legend
 Genevieve Garvan Brady, American philanthropist and Papal duchess
 Genevieve (given name), a given name for females
 Genevieve Range, a mountain range on Vancouver Island, British Columbia, Canada
 Genevieve (film), a 1953 British film
 Genevieve (album), a 2004 album by Velvet Cacoon, or the title track
 , a United States Navy ferry in commission from 1918 to 1919
 Genoveva, an opera by Schumann
 Geneviève (Bruneau)

See also
 Sainte-Geneviève, various buildings and place names
 Hurricane Genevieve (2014)